Manna is the third studio album by American soft rock band Bread, released in 1971. The title, like that of the preceding album On the Waters, is a Biblical pun on the name Bread, in this case the manna from Heaven which was fed to the Israelites. Although it was not literally bread (the word "manna" simply means "What is it?") it has often been metaphorically described as bread from Heaven. The singles "Let Your Love Go" and "If" were released from this album.

Track listing
Side one
"Let Your Love Go" (David Gates) – 2:25
"Take Comfort" (James Griffin, Robb Royer) – 3:33
"Too Much Love" (Griffin, Royer) – 2:46
"If" (Gates) – 2:36
"Be Kind to Me" (Griffin, Royer) – 3:04
"He's a Good Lad" (Gates) – 2:59
Side two
"She Was My Lady" (Gates) – 2:51
"Live in Your Love" (Griffin, Royer) – 2:46
"What a Change" (Gates) – 3:40
"I Say Again" (Griffin, Royer) – 2:52
"Come Again" (Gates) – 4:03
"Truckin'" (Griffin, Royer) – 2:32

Personnel
David Gates - vocals, guitar, piano, keyboards, harmonica, violin, bass
James Griffin - vocals, guitar, keyboards
Robb Royer - guitar, bass, keyboards, backing vocals
Mike Botts - drums, percussion

Charts

Weekly charts

Year-end charts

Certifications

References

1971 albums
Bread (band) albums
Elektra Records albums
Albums produced by David Gates
Albums produced by Jimmy Griffin
Albums produced by Robb Royer